Michael Joseph Heathcott (born May 16, 1969) is an American former professional baseball pitcher. He played during one season at the Major League Baseball for the Chicago White Sox. He was drafted by the White Sox in the 13th round of the 1991 Major League Baseball draft. Heathcott played his first professional season with their Class-A (Short Season) Utica Blue Sox in 1991, and his last with the Triple-A affiliates of the Chicago Cubs (Iowa Cubs) and the Los Angeles Angels of Anaheim (Edmonton Trappers) in 2000.

References

External links

1969 births
Living people
American expatriate baseball players in Canada
Baseball players from Chicago
Birmingham Barons players
Calgary Cannons players
Charlotte Knights players
Chicago White Sox players
Creighton Bluejays baseball players
Edmonton Trappers players
Iowa Cubs players
Major League Baseball pitchers
Nashville Sounds players
Prince William Cannons players
Sarasota White Sox players
South Bend White Sox players
Utica Blue Sox players